is a Japanese football player for Fujieda MYFC.

Club statistics
Updated to 23 February 2020.

References

External links
Profile at Tochigi SC

Profile at Fujieda MYFC

1991 births
Living people
Sanno Institute of Management alumni
Association football people from Kanagawa Prefecture
Japanese footballers
J2 League players
J3 League players
Thespakusatsu Gunma players
Fujieda MYFC players
Tochigi SC players
Association football defenders